Humphrey Francis St John-Mildmay (25 December 1825 – 29 November 1866) was a British Liberal and Whig politician, and merchant banker.

St John-Mildmay was the son of Humphrey St John-Mildmay and Anne Eugenia Baring, daughter of Alexander Baring and Anne Louise née Bingham. In June 1861, he married Sybella Harriet Clive, daughter of George Clive and Ann Sybella Martha née Farquhar, but they had no children.

After unsuccessfully contesting Maidstone as a Whig at the 1857 general election, St John Mildmay was elected Liberal MP for Herefordshire at the 1859 general election and held the seat until 1865, when he stood down.

References

External links
 

Liberal Party (UK) MPs for English constituencies
UK MPs 1859–1865
1825 births
1866 deaths